Mr Duke (born 1 April 1983 as David Edwards) is a Welsh bilingual country singer-songwriter. Born in Snowdonia, North Wales he took his name from a character in Hunter S. Thompson's 1971 novel Fear and Loathing in Las Vegas.

At the age of 17 he left North Wales for London to join prog band Elysium Field whom, he stayed with until 2003.
The following couple of years resulted in Duke hitch-hiking all over Europe, reading 1950’s American Beat literature, which would have a profound effect, as did the music of that era.

After returning to the UK, and ready to record again, Mr Duke’s first solo album was released by Earth Monkey Productions in May 2007, entitled, I Can't Find My Keys. Later in the same year, Duke released Is this anti-folk, anti-folk a genre Duke had not long discovered, and by which he was deeply influenced.

In Cardiff, 2008, Mr Duke formed his backing band, known as The Hoodlum Circus, taken from a Hunter S. Thompson book, Hell's Angels: The Strange and Terrible Saga of the Outlaw Motorcycle Gangs.

This band consisted of Cristian "Amigo" Marcico (Drums), Josh "Yoshi" Webber (Bass) and Gareth "Macauly Crackpipe" Grant (Guitar). In 2008 Mr Duke, backed by 'The Hoodlum Circus' released Who Shot Mr Duke? described as the "Welsh Flaming Lips" by Tom Robinson, bbc6 music.

2010 saw the very small release (25 copies) of The Trail Of...... a collection of unfinished work, inspired by Peter Sellers

The backing band also had several rolling members, including Simon Bartlett, and Jacob Powell. Following the disbanding of The Hoodlum Circus, Mr Duke retreated to Snowdonia, where he recorded Be There to Love you, a countryesque album, and a homage to Townes Van Zandt, released by Blue Chartists in March 2011, which featured Sophie Cochrane from the bands Spencer Mcgarry Season and Barefoot Dance of the Sea

Discography
I Can't Find My Keys (EMP037) 2007
Is This "Anti-Folk? (AFUKEMP001) 2007
Who Shot Mr Duke? (BabyBlue033) 2008
The Trail of....... (BabyBlue056) 2010
Be There to Love you (BlueCrt001) 2011

Notes

External links
 I Can't Find My Keys

1983 births
Living people
21st-century Welsh male singers
Welsh buskers
Welsh guitarists
Welsh singer-songwriters
21st-century British guitarists
British male singer-songwriters